Tommy Archer (born November 16, 1954) is an American professional racing driver. He has competed in International Motor Sports Association, Sports Car Club of America, Trans-Am Series, 24 Hours of Le Mans and National Association for Stock Car Auto Racing events.

Racing career
Archer started his racing career in ice racing, running Porsches borrowed from his father's car dealership. He later attempted the SCCA Runoffs, finishing second in 1980. Along with his brother Bobby, Archer won an IMSA championship in 1984. The duo also ran road races with Porsche Le Car entries throughout the 1980s. In 1986, they won the SCCA drivers' championship. Late in the 1980s, Archer also drove Jeeps in the SCCA truck series. In 1987, Archer qualified fastest in the GTO class of the  24 Hours of Daytona. From 1989 to 1996, the brothers won an additional eight SCCA championships.

Archer also dabbled in the Trans-Am Series, helping Dodge enter victory lane. He debuted in the Trans-Am Series in 1992 and claimed a race win at Detroit Belle Isle. In both 1998 and 1999, Archer claimed the runner-up spot in the 24-hour race in Le Mans, France. The runs while Archer drove for Oreca. He also spent a stint driving in the American Le Mans Series. At the end of the 2004 season, he won the SCCA World Challenge title. Archer continued running SCCA events until the late 2000s. In 2015 and 2016, Archer raced Trans-Am cars again.

Personal life
Archer is a prostate cancer survivor. He is also a Coldwell Banker-affiliated real estate agent. He and his brother formerly operated an auto parts store in Duluth, Minnesota.

Motorsports career results

SCCA National Championship Runoffs

24 Hours of Le Mans results

NASCAR
(key) (Bold – Pole position awarded by qualifying time. Italics – Pole position earned by points standings or practice time. * – Most laps led.)

Craftsman Truck Series

References

External links

Tommy Archer at Driver Database
Archer Racing

1954 births
NASCAR drivers
24 Hours of Le Mans drivers
24 Hours of Daytona drivers
American Le Mans Series drivers
Rolex Sports Car Series drivers
Trans-Am Series drivers
Living people
Sportspeople from Duluth, Minnesota
Racing drivers from Minnesota
SCCA National Championship Runoffs participants
Oreca drivers
FIA GT Championship drivers